Lai Chee-ying (born 8 December 1947), also known as Jimmy Lai, is a Hong Kong businessman and politician. He founded Giordano, an Asian clothing retailer, Next Digital (formerly Next Media), a Hong Kong-listed media company, and the popular newspaper Apple Daily. He is one of the main contributors to the pro-democracy camp, especially to the Democratic Party. Although he is known as a Hong Kong political figure, he has been a UK national since 1996. Lai is also an art collector.

A prominent critic of the Chinese Communist Party, Lai was arrested on 10 August 2020 by the Hong Kong police on charges of violating the territory's new national security law, an action which prompted widespread criticism. Lai was allowed bail on 12 August, but on 3 December, Lai was accused of fraud and his bail was revoked. The court decided to jail Lai until April 2021, marking the first time Lai has been detained. Lai regarded his imprisonment as "the summit of his own life".

In December 2020, Lai was awarded the "Freedom of Press Award" by Reporters Without Borders for his role in founding Apple Daily, a news outlet under Lai's pro-democracy leadership that "still dares to openly criticise the Chinese regime and which widely covered last year's pro-democracy protests." On 29 December, Lai resigned from his roles with Next Digital as director and chairman of the board.

In April 2021, he was sentenced to an additional 14 months in prison for organizing illegal protests.

Early life

Lai was born in Canton (Guangzhou), China on 8 December 1947. At the age of 12, he entered Hong Kong as a stowaway on a boat. Upon his arrival, Lai began work as a child labourer in a garment factory for a wage of the equivalent of US$8 per month. Lai is a practising Catholic.

Founding of Giordano

Lai's factory work saw him rise to the position of factory manager. In 1975, Lai used his year-end bonus on Hong Kong stocks to raise cash and bought a bankrupt garment factory, Comitex, where he began producing sweaters. Customers included J.C. Penney, Montgomery Ward, and other U.S. retailers.

By rewarding sellers with financial incentives in Hong Kong, he built the chain into an Asia-wide retailer. Giordano was said to have more than 8,000 employees in 2,400 shops in 30 countries.

Lai has kept Comitex active as a shell company since he left the garment industry for media and politics in the 1990s. After his arrest under National Security Law in August 2020, Lai tried to sell his asset in Hong Kong, including the entire floor of Tai Ping Industrial Centre. The current owner of the property is Comitex Knitters Ltd. Comitex, along with other private companies controlled by Lai, was reported to be the financial tools for his political activities and donations.

Publications 

Lai pioneered a reader-centric philosophy with paparazzi journalism in Hong Kong based on publications such as USA Today and The Sun. His best-selling Next Magazine and Apple Daily newspaper featured a mix of racy tabloid material and news items oriented to the mass market with plenty of colour and graphics that attracts a wide range of readers, some of whom are also critics of Lai and his ideology.

Hong Kong publications

Owing to the 1989 Tiananmen Square protests and massacre, Lai became an advocate of democracy and critic of the People's Republic of China government. He began publishing Next Magazine, which combined tabloid sensationalism with hard-hitting political and business reporting. He proceeded to found other magazines, including Sudden Weekly, Eat & Travel Weekly, Trading Express/Auto Express and the youth-oriented Easy Finder.

In 1995, as the Hong Kong handover approached, Lai founded Apple Daily, a newspaper start-up that he financed with $100 million of his own money. The newspaper's circulation rose to 400,000 copies by 1997, which was the territory's second largest among 60 other newspapers. According to Lai, he aspired to maintain freedom of speech in Hong Kong through Apple Daily. In addition to promoting democracy, Lai's publications often ruffled feathers of fellow Hong Kong tycoons by exposing their personal foibles and relations with local government.

In 2003, ahead of the record-breaking pro-democracy protests in Hong Kong during July, the cover of Next Magazine featured a photo-montage of the territory's embattled chief executive Tung Chee-Hwa taking a pie in the face. The magazine urged readers to take to the streets while Apple Daily distributed stickers calling for Tung to resign.

In 2006, Sudden Weekly and Next Magazine ranked first and second in circulation for Hong Kong's magazine market. Apple Daily became the No. 2 newspaper in Hong Kong.

In 2020, Lai launched an English version of Apple Daily.

Taiwan publications

Lai launched Taiwanese editions of Next Magazine in 2001 and Apple Daily in 2003, taking on heavily established rivals who made considerable effort to thwart him. Rival publishers pressed advertisers to boycott and distributors not to undertake home delivery. His Taiwan offices were vandalised on numerous occasions. As the publications grew to have the largest readership in their category, the advertising boycotts ended.

In October 2006, Lai launched Sharp Daily (Shuang Bao in Mandarin), a free daily newspaper targeting Taipei commuters. The company also launched Me! Magazine in Taiwan.

In building Taiwan's most popular newspaper, Apple Daily, and magazine, Next Magazine, Lai's racy publications were described as having a great impact on the country's hitherto staid media culture.

Publication challenges

Lai's publications remained banned in China since their inception. The ban originated from Lai's 1994 newspaper column, where he told Premier of the PRC Li Peng, seen as a driving force behind the Tiananmen Square crackdown, to "drop dead". He also called the Chinese Communist Party "a monopoly that charges a premium for lousy service". China's government retaliated against Lai by starting a shut-down of Giordano shops, prompting him to sell out of the company to save it. In addition to having his publications banned in China, businesses had distanced themselves from placing advertisements in Apple Daily to avoid retaliation from the Chinese government.

Lai had frequently faced hostility from the many Beijing-backed tycoons, including attempts to force supplier boycotts of his companies. Major Hong Kong property developers and top companies advertised only in competing publications not owned by Lai. He also faced a lengthy battle to list on the Hong Kong Stock Exchange, which Lai sidestepped through a reverse takeover. He managed to list the company in 1999 by acquiring Paramount Publishing Group in October of that year.

Other companies

In 1997 Lai put up the capital for his twin sister, Si Wai, to acquire numerous properties in the Southern Ontario wine and vacation region of Niagara-on-the-Lake. The Lais Group of Companies now owns additional properties in Caledon, ON and Jordan, ON. Lai remains the owner despite his arrest.

During the dot-com boom of the late 1990s, Lai started an Internet-based grocery retailer that offered home delivery services, adMart. The business expanded its product scope beyond groceries to include electronics and office supplies, but was shut down after losing between $100 and $150 million. Lai attributed this business failure to overconfidence and a lack of viable business strategy.

In 2011, Next Media reportedly sold 70 per cent stake of Next Media's subsidiary Colored World Holdings (CWH, incorporated in the British Virgin Islands) to Sum Tat Ventures (STV, incorporated in the British Virgin Islands), a private company 100 per cent owned by Jimmy Lai. CWH was estimated to have net asset value of US$6.1 million. STV paid US$100 million in cash for 70 per cent stake of CWH. In 2013, STV paid another US$20 million for the remaining 30 per cent stake of CWH. CWH itself had its assets sold in 2011, and ceased operation in 2011. In total, STV paid US$120 million in cash for CWH. On Lai's Form 3B disclosure form, STV is listed as having the same correspondence address as Next Media in Hong Kong.

Near the end of 2013, Lai spent approximately US$73 million (or NT$2.3 billion) to purchase a 2 per cent stake (~17 million shares) in Taiwanese electronics manufacturer HTC.

Activities in Myanmar

In 2014, leaked documents showed Jimmy Lai paid former US deputy defence secretary and former World Bank president Paul Wolfowitz US$75,000 for his help with projects in Myanmar. Lai also reportedly remitted approximately US$213,000 to businessman Phone Win, with whom Lai's Hong Kong-registered Best Combo company reportedly collaborated on Yangon real estate projects.

Political activity in Hong Kong

Lai is a longtime champion of the Hong Kong pro-democracy movement. According to Lai, The Road to Serfdom by Friedrich Hayek inspired him to fight for freedom. His advocacy had been expressed through his business ventures, such as distributing Giordano t-shirts with portraits of student leaders. His high-profile support for the pro-democracy movements came under strong condemnation from the Chinese government. As the proprietor of one of few that journals that has remained staunchly supportive of the pro-democracy cause, challenging Chinese Communist Party rule, Lai is considered an "anti-China troublemaker".

On 13 December 2014, Lai was one of the pro-democracy leaders arrested during the clearance of the Admiralty protest site of the Umbrella Movement. On the following day, Lai announced he would step down as head of Next Media "to spend more time with his family and further pursue his personal interests."

Lai had been the target of hostile attacks and disturbances, including the leaving of machetes, axes and threatening messages in his driveway. He had been rammed by a car, and his home was firebombed several times, most recently in 2019. Next Media spokesman Mark Simon condemned these attacks and stated, "This is a continual effort to intimidate the press in Hong Kong. This is raw and pure intimidation." Some activists felt that the Hong Kong Police Force and the Hong Kong government, which have been Chinese-controlled since the handover in 1997, did not always follow up on these misconducts against Lai, and that culprits are rarely found.

During the early hours of 12 January 2015, two masked men hurled petrol bombs at Lai's home on Kadoorie Avenue in Kowloon Tong. At the same time, a petrol bomb was thrown at the Next Media headquarters in Tseung Kwan O Industrial Estate. The fires were extinguished by security guards. The perpetrators fled and two cars used in the attacks were found torched in Shek Kip Mei and Cheung Sha Wan. The crimes were denounced as an "attack on press freedom".

Between July and November 2019 Lai was able to meet with US Vice President Mike Pence and later with US House Speaker Nancy Pelosi to discuss the Hong Kong protests. Pelosi published a photograph of herself, Lai, along with Martin Lee and Janet Pang and supporting words to the Hong Kong protesters. Lai also later met with then US National Security Adviser John Bolton. Bloomberg reporter, Nicholas Wadham tweeted that the meeting was meant to send a signal to Beijing, as it was very "unusual for non governmental visitors to get this kind of access".

On 28 February 2020, Lai was arrested for illegal assembly during his attendance in the 2019–2020 Hong Kong protests, and for allegedly intimidating an Oriental Daily reporter after the reporter took photos of him in 2017. His case was scheduled to be heard at Eastern Law Court on 5 May. On 18 April 2020, Lai was among 15 high-profile democracy figures arrested in Hong Kong. According to a police statement, his arrest was based on suspicion of organising, publicizing or taking part in several unauthorized assemblies between August and October 2019.

On 3 September 2020, Lai was found not guilty of the Oriental Daily criminal intimidation charge.

In December 2020, BBC News interviewed him when he was temporarily out on bail and continuing his activism from Apple Daily newsroom. Lai tearfully admitted his fear for his family as he continues his activism.  He stated that if he ended up in jail, then he was living his life meaningfully. Lai stated that "If [the government] can induce fear in you, that's the easiest way to control you", adding that inducing fear was the cheapest and most effective way to control people.

National security law and arrests 

On 30 June 2020, the Hong Kong national security law was enacted by China's parliament, by-passing the Legislative Council of Hong Kong. Before the law was enacted, Lai called it "a death knell for Hong Kong" and alleged that it would destroy the territory's rule of law.

On 10 August 2020, Lai was arrested at his home for alleged collusion with foreign forces (a crime under the new national security law) as well as fraud. Other Next Digital staff were also arrested, and police searched the home of both Lai and his son. Later in the morning, approximately 200 Hong Kong police officers raided the offices of Apple Daily in Tseung Kwan O Industrial Estate, seizing around 25 boxes of materials. HSBC took the step to freeze his bank account.

After Lai was arrested, the stock price of Next Digital rose as high as 331 per cent on 11 August. Bail was set at HK$300,000 (approx. US$38,705), with a surety of HK$200,000 (approx. US$25,803). Apple Daily said that more than 500,000 copies of its subsequent day's paper were printed, five times the usual number. The front page of Apple Daily showed an image of Lai in handcuffs with the headline: "Apple Daily must fight on."

The Hong Kong and Macao Affairs Office, an agency of mainland China, welcomed the arrest and called for Lai to be severely punished. The Hong Kong Journalists Association described the raid as "horrendous" and unprecedented in Hong Kong. The Democratic Party accused the government of trying to create a chilling effect in the Hong Kong media industry. Former governor Chris Patten called the events "the most outrageous assault yet" on Hong Kong's press. The head of the University of Hong Kong journalism department called the raid an "outrageous, shameful attack on press freedom".

Other pro-democracy figures were arrested for national security crimes on the same day, including Agnes Chow, Wilson Li, Andy Li, and at least four others.

On 2 December 2020, Lai reported to the police station as part of his bail condition for his August arrest related to on-going national security law violation but was immediately arrested by police for alleged fraud, in that he and two Next Digital executives allegedly violated lease terms for Next Digital office space. Police referred to a further investigation into possible national security law violation against one of the three, apparently referring to Lai. The case was adjourned until April 2021, with Lai being denied bail.

On 11 December 2020, Lai became the first high-profile figure to be charged under the new national security law for allegedly conspiring and colluding with foreign forces to endanger national security. The main evidence for those charges, according to the prosecutors, consisted of statements that Lai had made on Twitter.

On 23 December 2020, Lai was granted bail by the High Court with the following conditions: HK$10 million deposit; HK$100,000 deposit by each of his three guarantors; To remain at his home at all times, except when reporting to police or attending court hearings (de facto house arrest); Surrender all travel documents; Banned from attending or hosting media interviews or programmes; Banned from publishing articles on any media, posting messages or comments on social media, including Twitter; Report to police thrice a week.

On 31 December 2020, the Court of Final Appeal ordered him back to prison after the Department of Justice, under prosecutor Anthony Chau Tin-hang, appealed his release on bail. On 9 February 2021, Hong Kong's top court denied his bail; a new bail application by Lai was rejected on 19 February.

On 16 February, Lai was arrested while in prison for alleged violations of the national security law, including a charge of aiding activist Andy Li in his ill-fated attempt to escape to Taiwan with eleven others in August 2020.

On 1 April 2021, he was convicted on a separate case over "unlawful assembly" during the 2019 protests along six other activists and politicians. On 16 April 2021, he was sentenced to 14 months in prison for the unauthorised assembly charge. As the sentencing was carried out, friends and family shouted "stand strong" and other words of support.

In May 2021, Lai's assets were all frozen by the Hong Kong government, including all the shares of Next Digital Limited and the property and local bank accounts of three companies owned by him. On 28 May 2021, Lai was sentenced to additional 14 months' imprisonment over his role in an unauthorised assembly in 2019. He must now serve 20 months in prison.

On 9 December 2021, (whilst serving his 21 April 2021 sentence) Lai and two others were convicted for their roles in the banned Tiananmen candlelight vigil in Hong Kong, Lai, together with Chow Hang-tung, a vice chairperson of the now-defunct vigil organiser the Hong Kong Alliance in Support of Patriotic Democratic Movements of China, and activist and former reporter Gwyneth Ho were convicted for either taking part in or inciting others to join the vigil. On 13 December 2021, Lai was sentenced to additional 13 months' imprisonment over his role in the banned vigil.

A documentary about the political activism of Lai was released by the Acton Institute in 2022 to significant critical acclaim called The Hong Konger. In the film, Lai refers to how COVID-19 was used as a pretext for banning protesters from organizing following the initial eruption of activity that came after the extradition law was first proposed in 2019. Lai went on to state that, "The younger generation and the older generation have never been so united." and that, "If we just surrender, we will lose everything." The documentary is also critical of the relationship between corporate investment and the lure to Western companies of Chinese markets and the potential for profit, as Jack Wolfsohn in the National Review stated:  At an event screening the film, Mark Clifford, president of the Committee for Freedom in Hong Kong, warned of future conflicts, specifically speaking of Taiwan and beyond, "It won’t stop in Taiwan. Totalitarianism is a cancer. It’s spreading."

On 22 August 2022, Lai pled not-guilty to the charges related to "collusion with foreign forces."

In late 2022, Paul Lam and the Department of Justice made several appeals to the court system, in an attempt to disallow Lai from using a UK lawyer, Tim Owen. Upon rejection of the last appeal at the High Court on 28November 2022, the government turned to the  NPCSC to give an interpretation of the relevant passages of the National Security Law; on 30December, the NPCSC ruled in favour of the government, giving the chief executive the power to bar foreign lawyers from cases related to national security. 

On 10 December 2022, Lai was sentenced to five years and nine months, and fined 2 million Hong Kong dollars, over the fraud case.

Art collection

Lai is also known as an art collector, especially known for a collection of artist Walasse Ting's pieces.

Awards

In June 2021, Lai received the 2021 Gwen Ifill Press Freedom Award from the Committee to Protect Journalists, and in December that year, together with the staff of shuttered Apple Daily, the Golden Pen of Freedom Award from the World Association of Newspapers and News Publishers. Sebastien Lai received the latter award on behalf of his incarcerated father.

In April 2022, Lai was amongst five Hong Kong citizens to be nominated for the Nobel Peace Prize for "putting his freedom on the line".

In May 2022, Lai was awarded an honorary degree from The Catholic University of America, for his faith and decision to remain in Hong Kong to fight for democracy. Due to his current imprisonment, the award was accepted by Lai's son, Sebastien.

See also

 Apple Daily (Taiwan)
 Apple Daily raids and arrests
 A Taste of Chocolate – Film about Jimmy Lai's early years
 Giordano International
 HKSAR v Lai Chee Ying
 The Hong Konger Movie –Film about Jimmy Lai's activism in recent years
 Next Digital
 One country, two systems
 Pro-democracy camp (Hong Kong)
 Special administrative regions of China

References

External links

New York Times profile (paid)
Asia Times profile
Time magazine profile
Wired magazine profile
Columbia Journalism Review profile
Asiaweek profile
Admart website
The Call of the Entrepreneur, a 2007 documentary produced by the Acton Institute
The Apple Daily 

1947 births
Living people
Businesspeople from Guangzhou
Hong Kong billionaires
Hong Kong democracy activists
Hong Kong chief executives
Hong Kong textiles industry businesspeople
Hong Kong newspaper people
Hong Kong writers
Writers from Guangzhou
Next Digital people
Billionaires from Guangdong
Newspaper founders
Hong Kong Roman Catholics
Prisoners and detainees of Hong Kong
Hong Kong political prisoners
Hong Kong Christians
People convicted under the Hong Kong national security law
People with multiple nationality